Stefanja Orlowska (born 23 July 1987) is an Australian actress and writer. She made her film debut in 2011, in the independent film Minds, Adolescents. She is most known for her role as Halina in the documentary film There Is Many Like Us.

Early life
Orlowska was born to Polish immigrants in Canberra, Australia. She has one older brother, fashion designer Andrzej Krzysztof. From an early age Orlowska was an active child attending Leg's Dance taking classes in Jazz, Tap and Ballet. Later she went on to study at the Australian Acting Academy picking up many improv skills.

After graduating from high school, Orlowska attended Griffith University, attaining a double computer degree. Although she studied intently, in 2010, Orlowska made the decision to relocate to Los Angeles to pursue a career in acting.

Filmography

References

External links
 

1987 births
Living people
Australian film actresses
Griffith University alumni
Actresses from Canberra
20th-century Australian women
21st-century Australian women